Belovalva is a genus of moths in the family Gelechiidae. It contains the species Belovalva nigripuncta, which is found in South Africa and Zimbabwe.

References

Gelechiinae